Events in the year 1911 in Ecuador.

Incumbents
President: Eloy Alfaro until August 12, Carlos Freile Zaldumbide until September 1, Emilio Estrada Carmona until December 21, Carlos Freile Zaldumbide

Events
President Alfaro is removed from office. After a failed attempt to regain office, he is captured near Guayaquil and sent to Quito on a railroad built during his term in office. He is later exiled to Panama.

Births

Deaths
October 9 - Antonio Borrero, President 1875-1876
December 21 - Emilio Estrada Carmona, President

 
1910s in Ecuador